Hime is a Japanese woman of noble birth.

Hime may also refer to:

 Hime (surname), including a list of people with that surname
 Hime (rapper) (born 1979), Japanese hip hop artist
 Hime Station, a train station in Tajimi, Gifu Prefecture, Japan
 Hime cut, a hairstyle originating in Japan
 Hime (fish), a genus of flagfins
 Hime River, a river in Japan

See also